Seguenziidae is a family of very small deepwater sea snails, marine gastropod mollusks in the superfamily Seguenzioidea (according to the taxonomy of the Gastropoda by Bouchet & Rocroi, 2005).

Distribution
Species from this family occur in the Atlantic Ocean, the Pacific Ocean, the Indian Ocean and the Antarctic Ocean, mostly at bathyal and abyssal depths. Only a few species have been found at depths less than 300 m and none at intertidal depths.

Description
The thin, translucent, white shell has a trochiform shape. They are small or very small. Their maximum height is 22 mm. They are usually nacreous. The inner lip has often a tooth-like fold. The outer lip has characteristically one to three concave notches (except in the genus Guttula). The chitinous operculum is multispiral. The rhipidoglossan radula has intermediate characteristics of the former order Archaeogastropoda (by having more than two pairs of marginal teeth) and the former order Mesogastropoda (by having a single pair of lateral teeth).

Taxonomy 
This family consists of four following subfamilies (according to the taxonomy of the Gastropoda by Bouchet & Rocroi, 2005) with the following genera 

 Asthelysinae Marshall, 1991
 Anxietas Iredale, 1917
 Asthelys Quinn, 1987
 Eratasthelys Marshall, 1991
 Thelyssina Marshall, 1983
 Davisianinae Egorova, 1972 - synonyms: Putillinae F. Nordsieck, 1972; Oligomeriinae Egorov, 2000
 Davisiana Egorova, 1972
 Oligomeria Galkin & Golikov, 1985
 Guttulinae Goryachev, 1987
 Guttula Schepman, 1908
 Sericogyra Marshall, 1988
 Seguenziinae Verrill, 1884
 tribe Fluxinellini Marshall, 1991
 Ancistrobasis Dall, 1889
 Basilissa Watson, 1879
 Basilissopsis Dautzenberg & Fischer, 1897
 Calliobasis Marshall, 1983
 Fluxinella Marshall, 1983
 Thelyssa Bayer, 1971
 Visayaseguenzia Poppe, Tagaro & Dekker, 2006
 tribe Seguenziini Verrill, 1884
 Carenzia Quinn, 1983
 Hadroconus Quinn, 1987
 Halystes Marshall, 1988
 Halystina Marshall, 1991
 Quinnia Marshall, 1988
 Rotellenzia Quinn, 1987
 Seguenzia Jeffreys, 1876: the type genus
 Seguenziopsis Marshall, 1983
Unassigned :
 Bathymargarites Warén & Bouchet, 1989
Genera brought into synonymy
 Fluxiella Okutani, 1968: synonym of Fluxinella B.A. Marshall, 1983
 Seguenziella Marshall, 1983: synonym of Quinnia Marshall, 1988

References 

 Seguenza, G. 1876: Studii stratigrafici sulla formazione pliocenica dell'ltalia Meridionale. Bollettino del Regio Comitato Geologico d'Italia 5 & 6: 179-189
 Goryachev, W. N. (1979):  On the  system  of deep-sea molluscan family  Seguenziidae.  P.  70-71 in: Likharev, I. M. ed., Molluscs: main results of their study  - abstracts  of communications.  U.S.S.R Academy of Sciences Zoological Institute,  sixth meeting on the investigation of molluscs. Nauka
 Bandel, K. (1979): The nacreous layer in the shells of the gastropod family Seguenziidae and its taxonomic significance. Biomineralisation 10 : 49 - 61
 Quinn J.F. (1983). A revision of the Seguenziacea Verrill, 1884 (Gastropoda : Prosobranchia). I. Summary and evaluation of the superfamily. Proceedings of the Biological Society of Washington, 96(4):725-757
 Marshall B.A. (1991). Mollusca Gastropoda : Seguenziidae from New Caledonia and the Loyalty Islands. In A. Crosnier & P. Bouchet (Eds) Résultats des campagnes Musorstom, vol. 7. Mémoires du Muséum National d'Histoire Naturelle, A, 150:41-109

External links 
 Seashells of NSW info

 
Taxa named by Addison Emery Verrill
Gastropod families